Pasta e fagioli, meaning "pasta and beans", is a traditional Italian pasta soup. It is often called pasta fasul or pasta fazool in the New York Italian dialect, derived from its Neapolitan name, pasta e fasule.

Preparation
Recipes for pasta e fagioli vary, the only true requirement being that beans and pasta are included. While the dish varies from region to region, it is most commonly made using cannellini beans, navy beans, or borlotti beans and a small variety of pasta such as elbow macaroni or ditalini. The base typically includes olive oil, garlic, minced onion, celery, carrots, and often stewed tomatoes or tomato paste. Some variations omit tomatoes and instead use a broth base. Preparation may be vegetarian, or contain meat (often bacon, ground beef, or pancetta) or a meat-based stock.

Variations

The recipe varies greatly based on the region or town in which it is prepared, depending on available ingredients. The consistency of the dish can vary, with some being soupy, while others are much thicker. For instance, in Bari the dish is thicker in consistency and uses mixed pasta shapes. It also uses pancetta in the base of the sauce. Other varieties call for the beans to be passed through a food mill, giving it a stew-like consistency. Pasta e ceci, a version replacing the beans with chickpeas, is common in Rome.

In popular culture
"Pastafazoola", a 1927 novelty song by Van and Schenck, capitalizes on the Neapolitan pronunciation in the rhyme, "Don't be a fool, eat pasta fazool." The song "That's Amore", by Warren and Brooks (popularized by Dean Martin), includes the rhyme "When the stars make you drool, just like pasta fazool, that's amore". Pasta e fagioli was also among Dean Martin's favorite foods.

See also
Minestrone
Macaroni soup
List of Italian dishes
List of legume dishes
List of pasta dishes

References

Italian soups
Legume dishes
Pasta dishes
Montenegrin cuisine
Peasant food